John Ricardo Irfan "Juan" Cole (born October 23, 1952) is an American academic and commentator on the modern Middle East and South Asia. He is Richard P. Mitchell Collegiate Professor of History at the University of Michigan. Since 2002, he has written a weblog, Informed Comment (juancole.com).

Background 
Cole was born in Albuquerque, New Mexico. His father served in the United States Army Signal Corps. When Cole was age two, his family left New Mexico for France. His father completed two tours with the U.S. military in France (a total of seven years) and one 18-month stay at Kagnew Station in Asmara, Eritrea (then Ethiopia). Cole was schooled at twelve schools in twelve years, at a series of dependent schools on military bases but also sometimes in civilian schools. Some schooling occurred in the United States, particularly in North Carolina and California.

Baháʼí studies
Cole converted to the Baháʼí Faith in 1972 and spent 25 years writing and travelling in support of the religion. He had several works published through Baháʼí publishers and co-edited an online journal (Occasional Papers in the Shaykhi, Babi, and Baha'i Religions). Some of these were unofficial translations, and two volumes by/about early Baháʼí theologian Mírzá Abu'l-Fadl.

In 1994 Cole participated in a discussion group that became a forum for dissent among Baháʼí academics against the Baháʼí administration. Cole was perceived as leading a dissident faction, and resigned his membership in 1996 after being confronted by Baháʼí leadership. He declared himself a Unitarian Universalist. Soon after his resignation, Cole created an email list and website called H-Bahai, which became a repository of both primary source material and critical analysis on the religion. Cole went on to critically attack the Baháʼí Faith in several books and articles written from 1998–2002, describing a prominent Baháʼí as "inquisitor" and "bigot", and accusing Baháʼí institutions of cult-like tendencies.

Appointments and awards 
Cole was awarded Fulbright-Hays fellowships to India (1982) and to Egypt (1985–1986). In 1991 he held a National Endowment for the Humanities grant for the study of Shia Islam in Iran. From 1999 until 2004, Juan Cole was the editor of The International Journal of Middle East Studies. He has served in professional offices for the American Institute of Iranian Studies and on the editorial board of the journal Iranian Studies. He is a member of the Middle East Studies Association of North America, and served as the organization's president for 2006. In 2006, he received the James Aronson Award for Social Justice Journalism administered by Hunter College. He is a member of the Community Council of the National Iranian American Council (NIAC).

Notable work

Cole founded the Global Americana Institute to translate works concerning the United States into Arabic. The first volume was selected works of Thomas Jefferson, and the second was a translation of a biography of Martin Luther King Jr. along with selected speeches and writings.

Current affairs history
After September 11, 2001, Cole turned increasingly to writing on radical Muslim movements, the Iraq War, United States foreign policy, and the Iran crisis. He calls his work not "contemporary history" but "current affairs history". 

Cole testified on Iraq before the Senate Committee on Foreign Relations in 2004.

Informed Comment blog
Since 2002, Cole has published the blog Informed Comment, covering "History, Middle East, South Asia, Religious Studies, and the War on Terror". Cole's prominence quickly rose through his blog, and Foreign Policy commented in 2004, "Cole's transformation into a public intellectual embodies many of the dynamics that have heightened the impact of the blogosphere. He wanted to publicize his expertise, and he did so by attracting attention from elite members of the blogosphere. As Cole made waves within the virtual world, others in the real world began to take notice".

In 2006 National Journal called Cole "the most respected voice on foreign policy on the left" and his blog ranked the 99th most popular in 2009, but it has since fallen off the list.

Views
Leading up to the 2008 U.S. presidential election, Cole chastised several candidates, including Hillary Clinton, Rudy Giuliani, and Mitt Romney, for making bellicose statements about Iran in order to present themselves in a tougher or more conservative light. 

In 2002, Cole rejected the Bush administration's early claims of Iraqi cooperation with Al-Qaeda, commenting that Saddam Hussein had "persecuted and killed both Sunni and Shiite fundamentalists in great number", as well as claims to the effect that Iraq was developing weapons of mass destruction. Rather than making America safer, he says, the war has ironically had the opposite effect: inspiring anti-U.S. militants.

In a 2005 speech at the Middle East Policy Council, Cole was critical of the U.S. allying itself with offshoots of the Islamic Dawa Party in Iraq but vehemently opposing Hezbollah in Lebanon.

Ahmadinejad's remarks on Israel

Cole and Christopher Hitchens traded barbs regarding the translation and meaning of a passage referring to Israel in a speech by Iran President Mahmoud Ahmadinejad. Fathi Nazila of The New York Timess Tehran bureau translated the passage as "Our dear Imam [Khomeini] said that the occupying regime must be wiped off the map."

In an article published at the Slate website, Hitchens accused Cole of attempting to minimize and distort the meaning of the speech, which Hitchens understood to be a repetition of "the standard line" that "the state of Israel is illegitimate and must be obliterated." Hitchens also denigrated Cole's competence in both Persian and "plain English" and described him as a Muslim apologist.

Cole responded that while he personally despised "everything Ahmadinejad stands for, not to mention the odious Khomeini", he nonetheless objected to the New York Times translation. Cole wrote that it inaccurately suggested Ahmadinejad was advocating an invasion of Israel ("that he wants to play Hitler to Israel's Poland"). He added that a better translation of the phrase would be "the occupation regime over Jerusalem should vanish from the page of time," a metaphysical if not poetic reference rather than a militaristic one. He also stated that Hitchens was incompetent to assess a Persian-to-English translation, and accused him of unethically accessing private Cole e-mails from an on-line discussion group.

CIA harassment allegations
In 2011, James Risen reported in The New York Times that Glenn Carle, a former Central Intelligence Agency officer who was a top counterterrorism official during the administration of President George W. Bush, "said the White House at least twice asked intelligence officials to gather sensitive information" on Cole "in order to discredit him". "In an interview, Mr. Carle said his supervisor at the National Intelligence Council told him in 2005 that White House officials wanted 'to get' Professor Cole, and made clear that he wanted Mr. Carle to collect information about him, an effort Mr. Carle rebuffed. Months later, Mr. Carle said, he confronted a CIA official after learning of another attempt to collect information about Professor Cole. Mr. Carle said he contended at the time that such actions would have been unlawful."

Criticism

Yale controversy 
In 2006, Cole was nominated to teach at Yale University and was approved by both Yale's sociology and history departments. However, the senior appointments committee overruled the departments, and Cole was not appointed.

According to "several Yale faculty members", the decision to overrule Cole's approval was "highly unusual". Yale Deputy Provost Charles Long stated that "Tenure appointments at Yale are very complicated and they go through several stages, and [the candidates] can fail to pass at any of the stages. Every year, at least one and often more fail at one of these levels, and that happened in this case." The history department vote was 13 in favor, seven opposed, and three abstentions. Professors interviewed by the Yale Daily News said "the faculty appeared sharply divided."

Yale historian Paula Hyman commented that the deep divisions in the appointment committee were the primary reasons that Cole was rejected: "There was also concern, aside from the process, about the nature of his blog and what it would be like to have a very divisive colleague." Yale political science professor Steven B. Smith commented, "It would be very comforting for Cole's supporters to think that this got steamrolled because of his controversial blog opinions. The blog opened people's eyes as to what was going on." Another Yale historian, John M. Merriman, said of Cole's rejection: "In this case, academic integrity clearly has been trumped by politics."

In an interview on Democracy Now!, Cole said that he had not applied for the post at Yale: "Some people at Yale asked if they could look at me for a senior appointment. I said, 'Look all you want.' So that's up to them. Senior professors are like baseball players. You're being looked at by other teams all the time. If it doesn't result in an offer, then nobody takes it seriously." He described the so-called "scandal" surrounding his nomination as "a tempest in a teapot" that had been exaggerated by "neo-con journalists": "Who knows what their hiring process is like, what things they were looking for?"

Other controversies 

Alexander H. Joffe in the Middle East Quarterly has written that "Cole suggests that many Jewish American officials hold dual loyalties, a frequent anti-Semitic theme." Cole argues that his critics have "perverted the word 'antisemitic, and also points out that "in the Middle East Studies establishment in the United States, I have stood with Israeli colleagues and against any attempt to marginalize them or boycott them".

According to Efraim Karsh, Cole has done "hardly any independent research on the twentieth-century Middle East", and characterized Cole's analysis of this era as "derivative". He has also responded to Cole's criticism of Israeli policies and the influence of the "Israel lobby", comparing them to accusations that have been made in anti-semitic writings. 

Jeremy Sapienza of Antiwar.com has criticized Cole for what he deems as partisan bias on issues of war and peace, citing his support for wars supported by the U.S. Democratic Party as in the Balkans and Libya, while opposing wars supported by the U.S. Republican Party such as the wars in Iraq.

Selected bibliography

Monographs and edited works
 Engaging the Muslim World, Palgrave Macmillan, 2009. 
 Napoleon's Egypt: Invading the Middle East, Palgrave Macmillan, 2007. 
 The Ayatollahs and Democracy in Iraq, Amsterdam University Press, 2006. 
 Nationalism and the Colonial Legacy in the Middle East and Central Asia. Co-edited with Deniz Kandiyoti. Special Issue of The International Journal of Middle East Studies Vol. 34, no. 2 (May 2002), pp. 187–424
 Sacred Space and Holy War: The Politics, Culture and History of Shi`ite Islam, London: I.B. Tauris, 2002. 
 Modernity and the Millennium:The Genesis of the Baháʼí Faith in the Nineteenth-Century Middle East. New York: Columbia University Press, 1998. 
 Colonialism and Revolution in the Middle East: Social and Cultural Origins of Egypt's `Urabi Movement. Princeton: Princeton University Press, 1993. Paperback edn., Cairo: American University in Cairo Press, 1999.
 Comparing Muslim Societies (edited, Comparative Studies in Society and History series); Ann Arbor: University of Michigan Press, 1992.
 Roots of North Indian Shi`ism in Iran and Iraq: Religion and State in Awadh, 1722-1859. Berkeley and Los Angeles: University of California Press, 1988; New Delhi: Oxford University Press, 1991)
 Shi'ism and Social Protest. (edited, with Nikki Keddie), New Haven: Yale University Press, 1986.
 Muhammad: Prophet of Peace Amid the Clash of Empires. Bold Type Books, 2018.

Selected recent journal articles and book chapters

Reference:

 "Islamophobia and American Foreign Policy Rhetoric: The Bush Years and After". In John L. Esposito and Ibrahim Kalin, eds., Islamophobia: the Challenge of Pluralism in the 21st Century (Oxford: Oxford University Press, 2011), pp. 127–142.
 "Shi'ite Parties and the Democratic Process in Iraq". In Mary Ann Tetreault, Gwen Okruhlik, and Andrzej Kapiszewski, eds. Political Change in the Arab Gulf States: Stuck in Transition. (Boulder, Co.: Lynne Rienner Publishers, 2011). pp. 49–71.
 "Notes on 'Iran Today.' Michigan Quarterly Review. (Winter, 2010), pp. 49–55.
 "Playing Muslim: Bonaparte's Army of the Orient and Euro-Muslim Creolization". In David Armitage and Sanjay Subrahmaniyam, eds., The Age of Revolutions in Global Context, c. 1760-1840. (New York: Palgrave Macmillan, 2010), pp. 125–143.
 "Struggles over Personal Status and Family Laws in Post-Baathist Iraq". In Kenneth Cuno and Manisha Desai, eds., Family, Gender and Law in a Globalizing Middle East and South Asia (Syracuse: Syracuse University Press, 2009), pp. 105–125.
 "Iraq and the Israeli-Palestinian Conflict in the Twentieth Century". Macalester International, Volume 23 (Spring 2009): 3–23.
 "The Taliban, Women and the Hegelian Private Sphere", in Robert D. Crews and Amin Tarzi, The Taliban and the Crisis of Afghanistan (Cambridge, Mass.: Harvard University Press, 2008), pp. 118–154 (revised version of Social Research article below.)
 "Islamophobia and American Foreign Policy" Islamophobia and the Challenges of Pluralism in the 21st Century, (Washington, D.C.: ACMCU Occasional Papers, Georgetown University, 2008). Pp. 70–79.
 "Marsh Arab Rebellion: Grievance, Mafias and Militias in Iraq", Fourth Wadie Jwaideh Memorial Lecture, (Bloomington, IN: Department of Near Eastern Languages and Cultures, Indiana University, 2008). pp. 1–31.
 "The Decline of Grand Ayatollah Sistani's Influence". Die Friedens-Warte: Journal of International Peace and Organization. Vol. 82, nos.2–3 (2007): 67–83.
 "Shia Militias in Iraqi Politics". In Markus Bouillon, David M. Malone and Ben Rowswell, eds., Iraq: Preventing a New Generation of Conflict (Boulder, Co.: Lynne Rienner, 2007), pp. 109–123.
 "Anti-Americanism: It's the Policies". AHR Forum : Historical Perspectives on Anti-Americanism. The American Historical Review, 111 (October, 2006): 1120–1129.
 "The Rise of Religious and Ethnic Mass Politics in Iraq", in David Little and Donald K. Swearer, eds., Religion and Nationalism in Iraq: A Comparative Perspective (Cambridge, Mass.: Center for the Study of the World Religions/ Harvard University Press, 2006), pp. 43–62.
 "Muslim Religious Extremism in Egypt: A Historiographical Critique of Narratives", in Israel Gershoni, et al., eds. Middle East Historiographies: Narrating the Twentieth Century (Seattle: University of Washington Press, 2006), pp. 262–287.
 "Of Crowds and Empires: Afro-Asian Riots and European Expansion, 1857–1882". [Extensively revised.] In Fernando Coronil and Julie Skurski, eds. States of Violence. Ann Arbor: University of Michigan Press, 2006, pp. 269–305.
 "Empires of Liberty? Democracy and Conquest in French Egypt, British Egypt and American Iraq". In Lessons of Empire: Imperial Histories and American Power. Ed. Calhoun, Craig, Frederick Cooper and Kevin W. Moore, eds. New York: The New Press, 2006. pp. 94–115. .
 "A 'Shiite Crescent'? The Regional Impact of the Iraq War". Current History. (January 2006): 20–26.
 Juan Cole et al., "A Shia Crescent: What Fallout for the U.S.?" Middle East Policy Volume XII, Winter 2005, Number 4, pp. 1–27. (Joint oral round table).
 "The United States and Shi'ite Religious Factions in Post-Ba'thist Iraq", The Middle East Journal, Volume 57, Number 4, Autumn 2003, pp. 543–566.
 "The Imagined Embrace: Gender, Identity and Iranian Ethnicity in Jahangiri Paintings". In Michel Mazzaoui, ed. Safavid Iran and her Neighbors (Salt Lake City: Utah University Press, 2003), pp. 49–62.
 "Mad Sufis and Civic Courtesans: The French Republican Construction of Eighteenth-Century Egypt". In Irene Bierman, ed. Napoleon in Egypt. (London: Ithaca Press, 2003), pp. 47–62.
 "Al-Tahtawi on Poverty and Welfare", in Michael Bonner, Mine Ener and Amy Singer, eds. Poverty and Charity in Middle Eastern Contexts (Albany, NY: State University of New York Press, 2003), pp. 223–238.

Translations
 Religion in Iran: From Zoroaster to Baha'u'llah by Alessandro Bausani. [Editor of this English translation of Persia Religiosa, Milan, 1958, and contributor of afterwords and bibliographical updates]. New York: Bibliotheca Persica Press, 2000.
 Broken Wings: A Novel by Kahlil Gibran. [Translation of the Arabic novel, al-Ajnihah al-Mutakassirah.] Ashland, Or.: White Cloud Press, 1998)
 The Vision [ar-Ru'ya] of Kahlil Gibran [prose poems translated from the Arabic]. Harmondsworth: Penguin, 1998. [Hardcover Edn.: Ashland, Or.: White Cloud Press, 1994)
 Spirit Brides [`Ara'is al-muruj] of Kahlil Gibran [short stories translated from the Arabic]. Santa Cruz: White Cloud Press, 1993.
 Letters and Essays 1886–1913 (Rasa'il va Raqa'im) of Mírzá Abu'l-Fadl Gulpaygani [tr. from Arabic and Persian]. Los Angeles: Kalimat Press, 1985.
 Miracles and Metaphors (Ad-Durar al-bahiyyah) of Mírzá Abu'l-Fadl Gulpaygani [tr. from the Arabic and annotated]. Los Angeles: Kalimat Press, 1982)

References

External links

 Home page at the University of Michigan

1952 births
Living people
American bloggers
21st-century American historians
21st-century American male writers
American political commentators
University of Michigan faculty
Islam and politics
Former Bahá'ís
Translators from Arabic
Middle Eastern studies in the United States
University of California, Los Angeles alumni
Northwestern University alumni
Writers from Albuquerque, New Mexico
20th-century American writers
21st-century American non-fiction writers
American male non-fiction writers
Fulbright alumni